Dəmirçilər (also, Damirchilyar, Damirchilar, Demirchilar, and Demirchilyar) is a village and municipality in the Qazakh Rayon of Azerbaijan.  It has a population of 1,341.

References 

Populated places in Qazax District